Etlingera solaris is a monocotyledonous plant species first described by Carl Ludwig von Blume, and given its current name by Rosemary Margaret Smith.  Etlingera solaris is part of the genus Etlingera and the family Zingiberaceae. No subspecies are listed in the Catalog of Life.

References 

solaris
Taxa named by Rosemary Margaret Smith